Bacharach Institute for Rehabilitation is an inpatient and outpatient acute rehabilitation hospital with 50 beds located in the Pomona section of Galloway Township in Atlantic County, New Jersey, United States.  The Bacharach Institute also includes a subacute rehabilitation center called Renaissance Pavilion with 29 beds.  Bacharach treats patients after strokes, spinal cord injuries, brain injuries, and other acute illnesses or traumas. In addition to the Bacharach Institute and Renaissance Pavilion in Pomona, the Bacharach Institute has fifteen physical and occupational therapy centers in South Jersey.

In February 2023, it was announced that the hospital would close permanently at the end of March, concluding its 99 years of operation.

History
Bacharach Institute for Rehabilitation was founded in 1924 as a hospital for children with polio.

Renaissance Pavilion
Renaissance Pavilion is a subacute rehabilitation center with 29 beds.

Physical and occupational therapy
Bacharach Institute has fifteen physical and occupational therapy centers in Atlantic City, Brigantine, Egg Harbor Township, Linwood, Pomona, Galloway, Margate, Marmora, Mays Landing, Somers Point, Cape May Court House, Ocean City, Vineland, Little Egg Harbor Township, and Manahawkin.

References

External links

Galloway Township, New Jersey
Hospital buildings completed in 1924
Hospitals in New Jersey